Madam Who? is a 1918 American silent drama film directed by Reginald Barker and starring Bessie Barriscale. It was produced by Paralta Plays and distributed through W. W. Hodkinson Corporation and the General Film Company.

Survives in the Library of Congress, incomplete.

Cast
Bessie Barriscale as Jeanne Beaufort
Edward Coxen as John Armitage
Howard Hickman as Henry Morgan
Joseph J. Dowling as 'Parson' John Kennedy
David Hartford as Alan Crandall
Fanny Midgley as Mrs. Howard
Nick Cogley as Mose
Eugene Pallette as Lt. Conroy
Wallace Worsley as Albert Lockhart
Clarence Barr as President Abraham Lincoln
Bert Hadley as General Grant

References

External links

1918 films
American silent feature films
Films directed by Reginald Barker
American black-and-white films
Silent American drama films
1918 drama films
Films distributed by W. W. Hodkinson Corporation
1910s American films
1910s English-language films